Turro is a station on Line 1 of the Milan Metro. It was opened on 1 November 1964 as part of the inaugural section of the Metro, between Sesto Marelli and Lotto.

The station is located on Viale Monza, which is in the municipality of Milan. It serves the ward of Turro. This is an underground station with two tracks in a single tunnel.

References

Line 1 (Milan Metro) stations
Railway stations opened in 1964
1964 establishments in Italy